The Stalkers are a rock band from Australia. They formed in April 2002 when Regurgitator was taking a break.

Members
Ben Ely (Regurgitator, Pangaea, Broken Head, Jump 2 Light Speed)
Peter Kostic (Regurgitator, Front End Loader, Kryptonics, Hard-Ons, Nazxul)
Ray Ahn (Hard-Ons, Nunchukka Superfly)
Raymond Lalotoa

Discography
 Rock 'n' Roll, EP (2002) - Valve

References

Australian rock music groups